Dreamland EP: Marimba and Shit-Drums is the first EP released by Spencer Krug as Moonface. It was released on January 26, 2010. It is available on 12" vinyl and FLAC/MP3 digitally at the official Moonface website.

Track listing
 "Dreamland EP: Marimba and Shit-Drums" - 20:16

References

External links
 Official Moonface web page

2010 EPs
Spencer Krug albums